Count Pavel Pavlovich Demidov, 2nd Prince of San Donato (9 October 1839, Frankfurt am Main / Bad Kissingen – 26 January 1885, Pratolino, Florence) was a Russian industrialist, jurist, philanthropist and nobleman of the House of Demidov. He was the only child of Finnish philanthropist Aurora Karamzin and Prince Pavel Nikolaievich Demidov.

Life

Early life
Paul Pavlovich was six months old when his father died. Paul was a sensitive, beautiful, lively and versatile young man with a varied and short-tempered character. His education was planned by his mother and supervised by a governor. Experts were hired to teach individual subjects. Paul became interested in horses as a child and he took riding lessons, having the privilege of riding the horse of Grand Duchess Maria, due to his mother's close relations to the Imperial family.

He succeeded in obtaining a law degree in St. Petersburg in 1860. He worked for the state for a short time, e.g. as Extraordinary Secretary to the Russian Delegations in Vienna and Paris.

Paul's father's younger brother Anatole Demidov lived permanently in Florence. To secure the possession of his valuable art collection and other Demidov property, he made Paul his sole heir. King Victor Emanuel accepted the inheritance of the title of Prince of San Donato to Paul. Paul also received the same title from Alexander II in Russia. Paul also became Imperial Master of the Hunt and Privy Councillor, like his father.

Bachelor life

During Paul's years as a bachelor, he has been portrayed as a captivating personality, but also as a proud Demidov and bragger. Getting to know Uncle Anatole was not good for Paul. He led Paul into the world of gambling in the Paris aristocracy and into the arms of expensive mistresses. Paul devoted himself to leading the extravagant life of an young aristocrat at gambling casinos and hotels; at his homes in Paris and in the high society favoured spa town of Deauville.

Because of his volatile nature, he got into trouble time and time again - even in a duel with a Spaniard, which mother Aurora had to settle. Alarming information about Paul's behaviour was also carried to the relatives and to the court in Russia. Aurora settled in Paris for the winter seasons between 1863 and 1865 in an attempt to control her son's life. In order to pay Paul's enormous gambling debts, she had to sell Le Grand Sancy diamond for £100,000 (c. £6 million in 2017 currency), given to her as a morning gift the day after the wedding, by Paul's father.

It was not until 1862 that the estate of Father Paul Demidov was finally divided. At the same time, the management of the Demidov companies were completely taken over by the young Paul Demidov, when mother Aurora stepped aside. Uncle Anatole Demidov had resigned from the company as early as 1856, when Paul had turned 17 years old. The result was a decline in the profitability of the company's production. There were several reasons. Anatole Demidov's annuity was disproportionate to the company's return. Paul himself spent a wasteful life and had little interest in running the company.

Part of the reason was the abolition of serfdom in Russia in 1861, when mining companies also lost their free labour. As the situation worsened, mother Aurora had to return to the company's management. It was feared that the mines were running out, and costs rose when the workers had to be paid in cash. Paul had to sell his mansion in Paris along with its art collections, and also his luxurious villa at Deauville. The Demidov palace on the exclusive Bolshaya Morskaya Street in Saint Petersburg was rented and finally sold in 1875 to the Italian ambassador. Things came to such a state that Aurora's four stranded nut-sized morning gift pearls were being held by a bank as a security for the company's one million-rouble debt (c. $14,400,000 in 2017 currency). Pearls can be seen in the portrait of Aurora, with the young Paul.

However, Anatole Demidov's death in 1870 alleviated the situation of the Demidov company, as his large annuity did not accumulate anymore in the company's expenses.

Married life

Paul's troubled life was changed by his falling in love with a lady-in-waiting from Saint Petersburg, Princess Maria Mescherskaya. Paul met Maria in Paris in the spring of 1867.
His first marriage was 1 June 1867 to Princess Maria Elimovna Meshcherskaya (Saint Petersburg, 28 February 1844 - San Donato (or Vienna, per Ferrand), 8 August 1868). She died two days after giving birth to a son, Elim Pavlovich Demidov, 3rd Prince of San Donato, at Hietzing in the suburbs of Vienna 6 August 1868.

Losing his wife had a lasting effect on Paul, who remained inconsolable for a long time, spending a long while in the room in the Villa San Donato where Maria's dresses were kept, trying to recover her presence. Mother Aurora took charge of little Elim, who became very close to her grandmother. In October 1868, Paul and little Elim and Aurora moved to Paris, where they prepared a residence for themselves.

In the memory of his wife Paul set up a workplace for 200 women in the working-class district of Paris. The purpose of the department was to improve the moral and physical life situation of the working class. In 1869 he was appointed to the Kyiv Provincial Government. He held his office well and was promoted to mayor a year later.

Paul's uncle, Anatole Demidov, died in Florence in the spring of 1870. Paul permanently resigned from the civil service and moved on to live a great international life as Prince of San Donato. The mansion near San Donato in Florence with its valuable art collections was now been taken over by Paul Demidov.

He married secondly in Saint Petersburg 2 June 1871 to Princess Elena (Hélène) Petrovna Trubetskaya (Saint Petersburg, 25 September 1853 - Odessa, 28 July 1917). The mother of the new spouse, Princess Elisaveta (Lise) Trubetskaya, had lived most of her life in Paris, especially after the death of her husband Prince Pjotr Nikitich Trubetskoy (1826-1880).

They had six children:
 Prince, Count Nikita Pavlovich Demidov (17 March 1872 - 25 March 1874). Died as a child.
 Princess, Countess Aurora Pavlovna Demidova (Kiev, 2 November 1873 - Bussolino Torinese, Torino, 16 June 1904), married Prince Arsen of Yugoslavia in 1892, she is mother of Prince Paul of Yugoslavia
 Anatoly Pavlovich Demidov, 4th Prince of San Donato (San Donato, 31 October (OS)/ 12 November 1874 - Marseille 27 October 1943)
 Princess, Countess Maria Pavlovna Demidova (Kiev, 3 February 1877 - Pratolino, 25 July 1955), married in Helsinki, 30 April (OS) / 13 May 1897 Prince Semyon Semyonovich Abamelik-Lazarev (Saint Petersburg, 7 October 1857 - Narsan, Caucasus, 1 September 1916)
 Prince, Count Pavel Pavlovich Demidov (San Donato, 4 February 1879 - Paris, 30 April 1909), unmarried and without issue.
 Princess, Countess Elena Pavlovna Demidova (Saint Petersburg, 10 June 1884 - Sesto Fiorentino, 4 April 1959), married firstly in Saint Petersburg on 29 January 1903 (divorced in 1907) Count Alexander Pavlovich Shuvalov (Vartemiagui, 7 September 1881 - London, 13 August 1935) and married secondly in Dresden in June 1907 Nikolai Alexeievich Pavlov (Tambov, 9 May 1866 - Vanves, 31 January 1934)

Deciding that San Donato was too full of memories of his first wife, Paul bought in 1873 Pratolino, a large farm, from the estate of the Grand Duke of Tuscany. He immersed several millions in its restoration. When the castle-like Villa Pratolino, now known as Villa Demidoff, was ready to be inhabited, Paul and his family moved there from San Donato.
They ended up selling San Donato, and it was ceded on 5 November 1881 to Gaston Mestayer, a French business magnate, with the gardens sold separately to Nemesio Papucci and Rosselli Del Turco.

A large part of the enormous Demidov collection of artworks housed in 14 rooms at San Donato were thus dispersed in several sales and memorable public auctions, even the works gathered in the "musée napoléonien" created on Elba by his uncle Anatoly Nikolaievich Demidov, 1st Prince of San Donato and the souvenirs that had mostly been ceded to Anatole by his father-in-law Jérôme Bonaparte.

Life as philanthropist and patron of arts
By following his family traditions in charity, Paul Demidov was respected in Russia as well as in Italy and France. Her target areas were schools, universities, libraries, hospitals, pharmacies, folk kitchens, and single mothers' work homes. He supported the renovation of the cities of Kiev and Florence. Because of him, the Cathedral of Santa Maria del Fiore in Florence was completed. A visible sign of this is the coat of arms of Paul Demidov on the façade of the cathedral next to the main entrance.

Owning hundreds of factories in Russia, millions of square kilometres of land and palaces in Russia, France and Italy, Paul was considered as one of the richest men in Europe. He developed the family fortunes and inherited Anatole's title of Prince of San Donato after the latter's death without legitimate issue in 1870, with the title recognised by king Victor Emmanuel II of Italy two years later. He served with the Red Cross rather than the Russian military forces during the Russo-Turkish War and in 1883 he published the pro-Jewish "The Jewish Question in Russia".

Paul Demidov died at the age of 45, due to a liver disease. He was buried in the Demidov family mausoleum in Nizhny Tagil.
After Paul's death, his wife, Hélène Trubetskaya, took over the management of the company because all the children were minors, with the youngest only turning seven months old. The estate was divided in 1887 among several owners. Despite many difficulties, the Nizhny Tagil mining and factory area remained family-owned until 1917.

References

External links
 Princedom of San Donato
 Jewish Encyclopedia
 http://jssgallery.org/Essay/Italy/Demidoff/Demidoff_2nd.htm

1839 births
1885 deaths
Russian jurists
Pavel
Philanthropists from the Russian Empire
19th-century businesspeople from the Russian Empire
Princes of San Donato
Russian princes
Businesspeople from Frankfurt
Mayors of Kyiv
19th-century philanthropists
Russian people of Finnish descent
19th-century industrialists